The governor of Andhra Pradesh is the head of state of the Indian state of Andhra Pradesh. This is a list of governors of Andhra Pradesh, including Andhra State and united Andhra Pradesh, in office from 1953 to the present date. The official residence of the governor is the Raj Bhavan, situated in Vijayawada. E. S. L. Narasimhan is the longest serving governor. The current incumbent is S. Abdul Nazeer since 13 February 2023.

List

List of governors of Andhra state
Governors  of Andhra State, Andhra State consisted of  Coastal Andhra and Rayalaseema regions. This state was carved out of Madras State in 1953.

Data from Andhra Pradesh State Portal.

List of governors of Andhra Pradesh

On 1 November 1956, Hyderabad State ceased to exist; its Gulbarga and Aurangabad divisions were merged into Mysore State and Bombay State respectively. Its remaining Telugu-speaking portion, was merged with Andhra State to form the new state of United Andhra Pradesh.
The state was bifurcated into Andhra Pradesh and Telangana states on 2 June 2014 by Andhra Pradesh Reorganisation Act, 2014

See also
 List of governors of Telangana
 List of chief ministers of Andhra Pradesh
 Governors of India

Notes

References

External links
 Official Website of the Governor of Andhra Pradesh
 List on Andhra Pradesh State Government's Web Site

 
Andhra Pradesh
Governors